Els Belmans (born ) is a Belgian female  track cyclist. She competed at the 2011, 2013 and 2014 UCI Track Cycling World Championships.

Major results
2013
3rd Individual Pursuit, 3 Jours d'Aigle
4th EK Apeldoorn team pursuit
2012
4rd WK Apeldoorn scratch race

References

External links
 Profile at cyclingarchives.com

1983 births
Living people
Belgian track cyclists
Belgian female cyclists
Place of birth missing (living people)
People from Zoersel
Cyclists from Antwerp Province